The Pac-Man/Little Rascals/Richie Rich Show is a 90-minute Saturday morning animated package show co-produced by Hanna-Barbera Productions and King World Productions and broadcast on ABC from September 25, 1982 to September 3, 1983. The show contains the following three segments: Pac-Man, The Little Rascals and Richie Rich. It aired during the 1983-1984 season as The Little Rascals/Richie Rich Show.

Ownership 
Because The Little Rascals segment was co-produced by King World Productions, the rights to that segment are under different ownership than the others – CBS Media Ventures currently owns the rights. The Pac-Man and Richie Rich segments have been incorporated into the Warner Bros. library, due to various corporate changes involving Hanna-Barbera.

Segments 
The segment order for each ninety-minute episode was as follows:

 The Little Rascals - First segment (11 minutes)
 Richie Rich Riches (7 minutes)
 Richie Rich Gems (30 seconds)
 Richie Rich Treasure Chest (3 minutes)
 The Little Rascals - Second Segment (11 minutes)
 The Little Rascals - Vignette (30 seconds)
 Richie Rich Zillion-Dollar Adventures (11 minutes)
 Pac-Man - First segment (11 minutes)
 Pac-Mania - Vignette (30 seconds)
 Pac-Man - Second Segment (11 minutes)

Voice cast

Pac-Man 
 Marty Ingels - Pac-Man (Packy)
 Barbara Minkus - Ms. Pac-Man (Pepper)
 Russi Taylor - Pac Baby
 Lorenzo Music - Super-Pac
 Darryl Hickman - P.J.
 Frank Welker - Chomp-Chomp
 Peter Cullen - SourPuss
 Allan Lurie - Mezmaron
 Susan Silo - Sue
 Barry Gordon - Inky
 Chuck McCann - Blinky, Pinky
 Neilson Ross - Clyde

The Little Rascals 
 Scott Menville - Spanky
 Julie McWhirter Dees - Alfalfa, Porky, Woim
 Patty Maloney - Darla
 Shavar Ross - Buckwheat
 B. J. Ward - Butch, Waldo
 Peter Cullen - Pete the Pup, Officer Ed

Richie Rich 
 Sparky Marcus - Richie Rich
 Christian Hoff - Freckles
 Nancy Cartwright - Gloria
 Joan Gerber - Mrs. Rich, Irona
 Stanley Jones - Cadbury, George
 Bill Callaway - Professor Keenbean
 Dick Beals - Reggie
 Frank Welker - Dollar

References 

1982 American television series debuts
1983 American television series endings
1980s American animated television series
American Broadcasting Company original programming
American children's animated comedy television series
Animated television series about children
English-language television shows
Television shows based on Harvey Comics
Animated series based on video games
Pac-Man
Our Gang
Television series by Hanna-Barbera
Richie Rich (comics)
Television series by CBS Studios